St. Paul's Catholic Church is an American parish church of the Roman Catholic Archdiocese of San Francisco. The parish is located in the city of San Francisco, California, at 221 Valley Street and the corner of Church Street in the city's Noe Valley neighborhood.

History
St. Paul's traces its history back to 1876 when George Shadbourne communicated a desire to Archbishop Joseph Alemany, OP to have a new parish established, as well as a willingness to help collect money, purchase land, and construct a parish church. Archbishop Alemany approved the request, and in 1880 a church building and a residence for the curé was built. This first church seated up to 750 people, and served approximately 200 families.

In 1897, growth led the parish to construct the current 1,400 seat English Gothic structure. Construction took 14 years because the parish used "pay-as-you-go" financing on the new structure, therefore saving the parish from incurring construction debt upon completion. The new church was dedicated on May 29, 1911 by Archbishop Patrick W. Riordan.

The church required seismic reinforcement after the 1989 Loma Prieta earthquake. At one point, the archdiocese seriously considered closing St. Paul's because of the potential costs of reinforcing the church and adjacent buildings; this decision was later reversed. The parish sold some of the adjacent buildings and reinforced the remaining buildings, which cost approximately $8.5 million.

St. Paul's has also been the location for several movie and television episodes throughout its long history. In a season 4 episode of The Streets of San Francisco entitled "Requiem for Murder" there are both interior and exterior views of the church used during the episode. In 1992, the parish was the site of filming for the comedy film Sister Act, which starred Whoopi Goldberg. While the parish – called "St. Katherine's Monastery" in the film – is actually in the upscale middle class neighborhood of Noe Valley, the surrounding area was set redressed to make it appear that the church was in a much poorer community like the Tenderloin or Bayview.

External links
 The Parish Web Site

References

Roman Catholic churches in California
Landmarks in San Francisco
Roman Catholic Archdiocese of San Francisco
Roman Catholic churches in San Francisco
Religious organizations established in 1876
Roman Catholic churches completed in 1911
Gothic Revival church buildings in California
1876 establishments in California
20th-century Roman Catholic church buildings in the United States